Harry Carpenter (1925–2010) was a British sports commentator.

Harry Carpenter may also refer to:

Harry Carpenter (bishop) (1901–1993), English bishop and theologian
Harry Carpenter (priest) (1854–1936), Anglican priest
Henry Cort Harold Carpenter (1875–1940), British metallurgist

See also
Henry Carpenter (disambiguation)